Fernitz-Mellach is since 2015 a municipality with 4,654 residents (as of 1 January 2016) in Styria, Austria. It lies in the south of Graz-Umgebung District. The municipality was founded as part of the Styria municipal structural reform,
at the end of 2014, by merging the former towns Fernitz and Mellach.

Geography

Geographical layout 
The municipality runs along the Mur River.

Municipality arrangement 
The municipality territory includes the following five sections (population as of 1 January 2015):
 Dillach (365)
 Enzelsdorf (294)
 Fernitz (2954)
 Gnaning (402)
 Mellach (595)

and consists of the Katastralgemeinden Fernitz, Gnaning and Mellach.

History 
The municipality was founded on 1 January 2015 by merger of the municipality areas of Fernitz and Mellach.

References

External links 

 - collection of videos, documents

Cities and towns in Graz-Umgebung District